Petr Petrovich Elfimov (Piotr Jalfimaŭ, Pyotr Yelfimov) is a singer from Belarus who represented his nation at the Eurovision Song Contest 2009 in Moscow, Russia. He won the national selection of Belarus on 19 January 2009 with the rock/pop song Eyes That Never Lie. The song competed in the first semi-final as the fourth act. On 16 May it failed to win a place in the final, finishing 13th of 18 acts, receiving a total of 25 points. However, he has participated in the contest in the past as one of the backing singers for Aleksandra and Konstantin in the 2004 contest.

He was the Grand Prix winner of the 2004 Slavianski Bazaar in Vitebsk. From 1999 to 2007 Pyotr played the student game KVN. He appeared for two teams, who in different years became KVN's Major League Champions: BGU (Minsk), Champions in 1999 and 2001; and RUDN (Moscow), with whom he won the Super Cup with them in 2007 in Sochi. 

In 2019, Petr Elfimov was the opening singer for 2019 European Games held in Minsk, Belarus along with Alyona Lanskaja.

Photos

1980 births
Living people
People from Mogilev
21st-century Belarusian male singers
Eurovision Song Contest entrants for Belarus
Eurovision Song Contest entrants of 2009
Slavianski Bazaar winners